Aivilik, also known as Aivilingmiutut, Aivilimmiutut, Aivillirmiut, and Kangiqłniq, is a Canadian dialect of the Inuit language spoken along the northwestern shores of Hudson Bay in Nunavut.  The governments of Nunavut and the Northwest Territories generally consider it to be a dialect of Inuktitut, due to its location in Nunavut, as do some linguists, but it is instead sometimes classified as a dialect of Inuvialuk.  However, Inuktitut and Inuvialuk form a dialect continuum with few sharp boundaries.

References 

Inuit languages